Maurizio "Zanza" Zanfanti (20 October 1955 – 26 September 2018) was an Italian playboy who operated in Rimini and claimed to have slept with 6,000 women and to have done more for the Romagnol Riviera than "100 tourist agencies". He died from a myocardial infarction.

References 

1955 births
2018 deaths
People from Rimini
20th-century Italian people
21st-century Italian people